The 2008 UCI Road World Championships took place in Varese, Italy, between September 23 and September 28, 2008. The event consisted of a road race and a time trial for men, women and men under 23.

Qualification

Participating nations
Cyclists from 57 national federations participated. The number of cyclists per nation that competed is shown in parentheses.

Medal table

Events summary

External links

Official website
UCI Website for Road World Championships
Cyclingnews.com  Cycling News and Race Results

 
UCI Road World Championships by year
Uci Road World Championships
September 2008 sports events in Europe